Ricardo Blanco (born 12 May 1989 in Costa Rica) is a Costa Rican professional footballer who currently plays for Saprissa.

References

Costa Rican footballers
Living people
1989 births
Association football midfielders
Belén F.C. players
Deportivo Saprissa players
C.S. Cartaginés players